The 2018–19 Martinique Championnat National is the 99th season of the Martinique Championnat National, the top division football competition in Martinique. The season began on 14 September 2018 then it ended.

League table

References

External links
Ligue de football de la Martinique

Martinique Championnat National
Martinique
2018–19 in Martiniquan football